Buddy's Baddest: The Best of Buddy Guy is a blues compilation album by Buddy Guy. It was released in 1999 and contains his greatest hits. The album peaked at No. 7 on the Top Blues Albums chart in 1999.

Track listing
All tracks composed by Buddy Guy; except where indicated
"Damn Right, I've Got the Blues" - 4:33
"Five Long Years" (Eddie Boyd, John Lee Hooker) - 8:29
"Mustang Sally" (Sir Mack Rice) - 4:49
"Rememberin' Stevie" - 7:01
"She's a Superstar" - 5:06
"Feels Like Rain" (John Hiatt) - 4:39
"She's Nineteen Years Old" (Muddy Waters) -5:47
"I Smell Trouble" (Don Robey) - 3:19
"Someone Else Is Steppin' In (Slippin' Out, Slippin' In)" (Denise LaSalle) - 4:28
"My Time " (Ron Badger, Sheldon Feinberg, Robert Geddins) - 7:45
"Midnight Train" (featuring Jonny Lang) (Roger Reale, Jon Tiven) - 5:23
"Miss Ida B" (Roosevelt Sykes) - 6:33
"Need Your Love So Bad" (Little Willie John, Mertis John Jr.) - 2:58
"Innocent Man/Mannish Boy/Backdoor Man" - 5:47

References 

1999 greatest hits albums
Buddy Guy albums